William Culp Krueger (born April 24, 1958) is a former Major League Baseball pitcher, who played from  to  for eight teams. He pitched for the Oakland A's, Los Angeles Dodgers, Milwaukee Brewers, Seattle Mariners (twice), Minnesota Twins, Montreal Expos, Detroit Tigers, and San Diego Padres.

Early career
After graduating from McMinnville High School in 1975, McMinnville, Oregon, Krueger began classes at the University of Portland on a basketball scholarship, where he was a four year starter and shared the backcourt  with Darwin Cook who played 8 seasons in the National Basketball Association.  Teaming with All-Americans Darwin Cook, Rick Raivio and Jose Slaughter, the Pilots averaged 18 wins a season his last 3 years there and beat two teams that ranked #1 in the country (San Francisco in 1978 and Oregon State in 1979).  Bill, a three year captain, received the Thomas A. Fagan Award after his senior year.   He began playing 1st base for the Pilots' baseball team in his sophomore year in 1977. A 3 year starter for the Pilots, Krueger was the team's most valuable player in 1977-78. In 1979-80, the Pilots set a school record for wins in a season.  Six players were drafted off of that team including Ken Dayley, the #3 player selected in the 1980 MLB draft. Dayley had a successful big league career and was a key bullpen member of the St. Louis Cardinals World Series Championship team in 1985. In 1980, Krueger was signed by the Oakland Athletics on July 12 as an undrafted amateur free agent and assigned to the Medford A's of the short-season single-A Northwest League despite only pitching 4 innings in college. Although he went winless for Medford in seven starts that year, he struck out 48 batters, recorded a complete game, and a save. He continued to make his way through the A's minor league system for the next two years, being called up to Double-A West Haven in 1981. In 1982, Bill had a breakout season in West Haven, going 15-9 with a 2.83 earned run average with 167 strikeouts in 181 innings pitched.  The West Haven club won the Eastern League Championship and Krueger made the AA All-Star Team.

Professional career

Krueger made his major league debut on April 10, as the A's starter for the sixth game of the season.  Facing the California Angels, Krueger pitched 7 innings and gave up 4 runs in the Oakland Coliseum.  Although Angels Brian Downing singled against him to lead off the game, Krueger got veteran right fielder Juan Beníquez to hit into a 4-6-3 double play.  Bill went 7-6 in 16 starts for the A's in 1983, before an elbow injury ended his season. Before being traded to the Dodgers midway through the  season, Bill posted a 27-31 record with a 4.69 earned run average.

Bill saw action in only 3 games in two seasons for the Dodgers, and spent the majority of the 1987 and 1988 seasons with the Albuquerque Dukes, the Dodgers Triple A affiliate.  Bill pitched a no-hitter for the Dukes in 1987 versus the Phoenix Firebirds and helped the Dukes win the Pacific Coast League Championship.  In 1988, he had his best season as a pro, going 15-5 and leading the Pacific Coast League in wins, earned run average, and shutouts. He also had success at the plate, hitting .285 with 2 HR's and 6 RBI's in limited at bats.  Bill was traded again to the Pittsburgh Pirates in late 1988.  The Pirates released him during spring training of 1989, and Bill then signed with the Milwaukee Brewers 10 days later.  He played in Milwaukee for only two seasons, performing well as both a starter and a reliever.  He strung together  straight scoreless innings during the 1989 season. Krueger signed as a free agent by the Seattle Mariners after the end of the  season.

Krueger enjoyed what was arguably one of the best statistical years of his professional career in the Mariners rotation that year by reaching new personal bests in wins (11), strikeouts (91), and earned run average (3.60).  Bill also pitched in a June 7 showdown with his former Brewers ballclub, pitching over six innings while allowing only one run and striking out 6. Bill also was named the American League Pitcher of the Month in July 1991.

Over the last 4 seasons of his career, Bill Krueger played for five different teams in the National and American leagues. Bill won 10 games for the Minnesota Twins during the  season, setting career high of innings pitched (200). He also was named American League Pitcher of the Month in April of that season. Krueger was traded to Montreal, where he spent 60 days before free agency whisked him to Detroit to play for the Tigers. He again set a new season-low in earned run average (3.40) while appearing in 32 games. Bill started the '95 season with the Padres but was released in May of that season and was then signed with the Mariners again in July 1995. An interesting footnote, Krueger finished with a .400 career batting average.

Bill Krueger won his last game as a major leaguer on August 6 in the same place he started his career; the Oakland Coliseum.  Against the A's that day, the 37-year-old pitched over 5 innings and allowed only one run.  He was kept off Seattle's '95 postseason roster.  Bill retired from pro baseball in the spring of 1996 after unsuccessfully making the Chicago Cubs roster.

Post-retirement
After his retirement in 1996, Krueger went into broadcasting. He was joined at the network in 2007 by former M's teammate Mike Blowers. For the past 7 years, Bill has been the Director of Individual Philanthropy for NW Center (www.nwcenter.org). After 13 years as a financial advisor, Bill returned to wealth management running business development for Coldstream (www.coldstream.com) in 2016.

With his wife Jo, Krueger is a past co-president of the Cure Autism Now Northwest chapter, now merged with Autism Speaks.  They were successful in making the NW Chapter the country's first chapter to raise $1 million.  They have publicly told the story of raising a daughter (Chanel) with autism.  Chanel recently graduated from Seattle U School of Law (2019). In 2012 at age 54, he experienced sudden cardiac arrest on August 10 at the Redmond Pro Sports Club, where four employees worked together to assist in saving his life. Krueger has since thanked them publicly for their efforts. .  Bill actively speaks out about the importance of heart health.

References

External links
, or Retrosheet, or Pura Pelota, or Northwest Roots Sports

1957 births
Living people
Albuquerque Dukes players
American expatriate baseball players in Canada
American men's basketball players
Baseball players from Oregon
Baseball players from Illinois
Beloit Brewers players
Denver Zephyrs players
Detroit Tigers players
Las Vegas Stars (baseball) players
Los Angeles Dodgers players
Madison Muskies players
Major League Baseball pitchers
Medford A's players
Milwaukee Brewers players
Minnesota Twins players
Modesto A's players
Montreal Expos players
Oakland Athletics players
Portland Pilots baseball players
Portland Pilots men's basketball players
San Diego Padres players
Seattle Mariners announcers
Seattle Mariners players
Sportspeople from McMinnville, Oregon
Sportspeople from Waukegan, Illinois
Tacoma Rainiers players
Tacoma Tigers players
Tigres de Aragua players
American expatriate baseball players in Venezuela
Toledo Mud Hens players
University of Portland alumni
West Haven A's players